Wild Cat is the debut album by the British heavy metal band Tygers of Pan Tang. It was released in 1980 on MCA Records, and reached #18 on the UK album chart. The album was re-issued in 1989 in a double-LP package with Spellbound, and on CD in 1997 with bonus tracks.

Critical reception
Goldmine called the album "an early biker-metal classic exuding all the boisterous charm one would expect from a bunch of young kids excitedly helping build a scene."

Track listing
All songs written by Jess Cox, Brian Dick, Rick Laws, and Robb Weir except where noted.

Personnel
Per the liner notes
Band members
Jess Cox – Vocals
Robb Weir – Guitars and Vocals
Richard 'Rocky' Laws – Bass and Vocals
Brian "Big" Dick – Sticks, Kicks and Gong

 Production
Chris Tsangarides – producer, engineer
Andrew Warwick – assistant engineer
Cream – artwork, design
Pete Vernon – photos
Grahame Thompson & Tom Noble – management for Pan Tang Productions
Grahame Thompson – tour manager

Charts

References

1980 debut albums
Tygers of Pan Tang albums
Albums produced by Chris Tsangarides
Albums recorded at Morgan Sound Studios
MCA Records albums